I'm Off Then: Losing and Finding Myself on the Camino de Santiago is a book by German writer Hape Kerkeling written in 2006 and translated into English in 2009. It has sold over three million copies. It has also been translated into French, Italian, Dutch, Polish, Latvian, Spanish, Korean and Chinese.

A film adaptation, directed by Julia von Heinz, with Devid Striesow and Martina Gedeck starring, was released on December 24, 2015.

References 

2006 non-fiction books
Camino de Santiago
21st-century German literature
German-language books
Travel books
Pilgrimage accounts
Spain in fiction
Non-fiction books adapted into films
German non-fiction books